Lifespan of a Moth is an album by American sludge metal band 16. It was released July 15, 2016 through Relapse Records.

Overview 
On May 18, 2016, Stereogum premiered a new track from The Lifespan of a Moth, "The Absolute Center of a Pitch Black Heart".

On June 9, 2016, Decibel premiered 16's video for "Peaches, Cream and the Placenta". Guitarist Bobby Ferry said of the track, "The song is a stressed-out walk down a well-trodden trail that we have been prancing down since the early '90s. The lyrics delicately touch with all thumbs on the subject of addictive personality sorcery that creates unintended helpless victims." The video was directed by longtime 16 collaborator and producer, Jeff Forrest.

Track listing

Personnel 
 Cris Jerue – vocals
 Bobby Ferry – guitar
 Barney Firks – bass
 Dion Thurman – drums

Production 
 Produced by 16 and Jeff Forrest
 Engineered and mixed by Jeff Forrest

References 

2016 albums
16 (band) albums